Nabi Osman  is a village in the northern part of the Bekaa Valley, on the lower slopes of the Anti-Lebanon mountain range.  It is located in Baalbek District and lies on the highway linking Lebanon and Syria.

The town is home to a public school and The Malik Wehbe library.

Families and Emigration
Due to economic problems and the Lebanese war, a large number of the population has emigrated to Australia, Italy, the Gulf States, the United Kingdom and West Africa. Unlike most of the villages in Northern Bekaa, most of the residents are secular and support the Syrian Social Nationalist Party. The village is home to several famous personalities:

 The most famous family leader in the region Ali Mohammad Nazha known as Abo Wajeb, he is the current elected Mayor of the Nabi Osman. He is known for his peace keeping, generosity, wisdom, charity works, serving and always helping the people of his village and surrounding areas.

Ali M. Nazha, an agriculture engineer who was instrumental in the Green Revolution in North Bekaa; Malek Wehbe, an SSNP martyr; Deeb El Kurdie, an SSNP activist; and soccer player Wael Nazha. 
Architect Hassan ali Nazha chef department of gecc design worked on more than 400 buildings, more than 50 palaces, 20 schools, commercial centers, hospitals, villas  etc. General manager of I.F.E.M sal. real estate development and consulting engineer. He is also very socially active.

Architect Adnan Mahmoud Al Achek, an award winning architect, worked on many notable buildings in the USA and received 6 awards for his design work. He is currently working as a real estate developer and also an owner of a design built company.
 Sohail Mohamad nazha he is the famous farmer in this village and he is his brother of ALI M.Nazha, an agriculture engineer.

Geography and Agriculture
The altitude of this village ranges from 950 to 1300 meters above sea level. The village is 123km away from Beirut situated between the towns of Al Ain and Labweh. Its economy is restricted to agriculture (figs, olives, apples, pomegranate, apricots, peach and grapes). The Orontes river rises in the springs of Laboue and flows through the lower parts of the village. The village also has game birds for hunting.

Climate
Winters in Nabi Osman are cold and dry, with temperatures seldom reaching freezing point.  On average, it snows three to five times per season.  Summers are very hot and dry, with temperatures seldom reaching 40 degrees Celsius. The average annual rainfall is 230 mm (9 in).

2014 Terrorist Bombings
On the night of 16 March 2014, two people were killed and 16 were wounded as a result of a terrorist suicide attack in Nabi Osman. This followed a series of rocket projectile attacks launched from the Syrian territory.

External links
Nabi Osmane, Localiban
http://www.nabiosman.altervista.org/

Populated places in Baalbek District